Mahakavi Kalidas is a 1966 Indian Tamil-language biographical film produced and directed by R. R. Chandran, starring Sivaji Ganesan. It is based on the life of the poet Kalidasa. The film was released on 19 August 1966.

Plot

Cast 

 Sivaji Ganesan as Chinnaiah / Kalidas
 Sowcar Janaki as Princess Sangeetha Vani / Vilasavathi
 R. Muthuraman as King Boja
 L. Vijayalakshmi as Mohanangi
 S. V. Sahasranamam (guest role)
 R. S. Manohar as Ambarisan
 V. K. Ramasamy as Konar
 Nagesh as Oviyar (guest role)
 A. Karunanidhi as Suppan
 C. K. Saraswathi as Chinnaiah's mother
 K. B. Sundarambal as Kali
 E. R. Sahadevan as King
 Usilaimani as Poet
 Karuppu Subbiah as Poet
 Karikol Raju as Barber
 C. S. Pandian
 S. V. Sivanandham
 G. Sakunthala
 M. S. Malathi
 P. K. Vijayarani

Soundtrack 
Music was composed by K. V. Mahadevan while the lyrics were penned by Kannadasan and Ku. Ma. Balasubramaniam. The "Sakunthalai" music drama was not included in the film but was released on gramophone record.

Reception 
Kalki praised the film for its songs and cast performances.

References

External links 
 

1960s biographical films
1960s Tamil-language films
1966 films
Films about Kalidasa
Films scored by K. V. Mahadevan
Indian biographical films